Notoacmeibacteraceae is a family of bacteria.

References 

Hyphomicrobiales